Bala Quila also known Alwar Fort is a fort in Alwar in Indian state of Rajasthan. It is situated on a hill in the Aravalli Range, above the town of Alwar. The fort was originally constructed by Nikumbh Rajputs in 928 CE. In 1492 Khanzada Alawal Khan won Bala Quila from Nikumbh Rajputs to stop practice of human sacrifice. Nikumbh Rajputs and their successors moved to the southwestern part of India through Baroda and settled over eastern Khandesh during 15th century onwards due to the Mughals as the Mughal Empire was expanding in and around western India which was due to its close proximity to the capital of Delhi at that time. It was re-constructed in 1521 CE by Hasan Khan Mewati. In the following centuries it went to the  Mughals. It was captured by the Jat ruler Suraj Mal. After his death however, it was captured by the Rajput ruler Maharao Raja Pratap Singh of Alwar State.
Major rivers like Narmada, Tapi, Girna basins were suitable for the Nikumbh Rajput warriors to settle down. As Rajputs found it as a suitable place for their successors due to it having ample of water and land for cultivation. 
Arwali mountain range divided mevad मेवाड़ & मारवा marwad.

Shirpur, Dhule, Tapi & Girna Rivers, and river Banks along with satputada mountain of and to the pitalkhora where they constructed their own Empire. Founding Ancient Shiva Temple situated in the valley of today's Pitalkhora Caves and its river side near Patna Devi Today. Nikumbh Rajputs. migrated and Expanded to Girna Bank basin near Undirkheda and some to Ranjangaon near to Gaoutala Sanctuary of Today.
 Kachwaha Rajputs.
Kachwaha Rajputs latter settled in bank and besins of Girna river of today's khandesh in Warkheda and Umberkheda. Pawar parmar  Rajput in Near Mehunbara of Today, kachwaha in Warkheda. Nikumbh Rajputs.in Undirkheda and Ranjangaon and Patna to Pimpalgaon at satpuda Ranges. Later, that area became part of the expanding Maratha Empire and the area was designated as a Vatandar during Peshwa rule under the kingdom of the Marathas.

Description 

The fort included 446 openings for musketry, along with 8 huge bastions encompassing it.

See also
 Alwar State

References

External links 

 Bala Quila, Alwar Fort
 

Infrastructure completed in 1550
Forts in Rajasthan
Alwar
16th century in India
Buildings and structures in Alwar
Tourist attractions in Alwar
1550 establishments in India